London is a city in and the county seat of Madison County, Ohio, United States. The population was 10,279 at the 2020 census. The ZIP code is 43140.

History
Soon after the village was platted in the early 1810s, a Methodist church was founded in the community. Today known as First United Methodist Church, this congregation built a small log church building in 1820; it was London's first church. In the early 1900s, the church added facilities for the storage of human milk to sustain the orphanage it then operated.

Geography

Demographics

2010 census
At the 2010 census London had 9,904 residents, comprising 3,991 households and 2,511 families. The racial makeup of the city was 89.2% White, 6.0% African American, 0.3% Native American, 1.0% Asian, 0.6% from other races, and 2.9% from two or more races. Hispanic or Latino residents of any race were 1.7%.

There were 3,991 households, 32.8% of which had children under the age of 18. 41.2% of households were married couples living together; 16.2% had a female householder with no husband present; 5.4% had a male householder with no wife present; and 37.1% were non-families. 30.8% of households were made up of individuals, and 13.5% were one person aged 65 or older. The average household size was 2.43, and the average family size was 3.00.

The median age was 37.1 years. 25.6% of residents were under the age of 18; 8.5% were between the ages of 18 and 24; 26.7% were from 25 to 44; 24.6% were from 45 to 64; and 14.6% were 65 or older. The gender makeup of the city was 46.9% male and 53.1% female.

2000 census
At the 2000 census there were 8,771 people in 3,590 households, including 2,301 families, in the city. The population density was 1,031.0 people per square mile (397.9/km). There were 3,848 housing units at an average density of 452.3/sq mi (174.6/km).  The racial makeup of the city was 89.96% White, 6.78% African American, 0.30% Native American, 0.42% Asian, 0.02% Pacific Islander, 0.42% from other races, and 2.10% from two or more races. Hispanic or Latino of any race were 0.71%.

Of the 3,590 households 32.0% had children under the age of 18 living with them, 46.4% were married couples living together, 13.6% had a female householder with no husband present, and 35.9% were non-families. 30.8% of households were one person and 13.8% were one person aged 65 or older. The average household size was 2.40 and the average family size was 3.00.

The age distribution was 26.6% under the age of 18, 8.2% from 18 to 24, 28.8% from 25 to 44, 20.3% from 45 to 64, and 16.0% 65 or older. The median age was 36 years. For every 100 females, there were 87.1 males. For every 100 females age 18 and over, there were 83.2 males.

The median household income was $35,641 and the median family income  was $42,400. Males had a median income of $33,092 versus $26,048 for females. The per capita income for the city was $18,404. About 9.5% of families and 11.7% of the population were below the poverty line, including 16.3% of those under age 18 and 11.7% of those age 65 or over.

Media

London and Madison County were served by a daily newspaper, The Madison Press, until it folded in early 2019. The county's weekly newspaper, The Madison Messenger, is also headquartered in London. There is also an online-only newspaper alternative, Madison County Spotlight, which was created to replace The Madison Press after it folded.

There is a local Christian radio station, ReadyFM (WCYC-LP, 105.1 FM), operating out of the town's old armory, just across from St. Patrick Church.

Education
London is primarily served by the London City School District. Graduating class sizes are usually between 100-150 students. The district partners with other local educational programs, including the Tolles Technical Center.

There is also a private school run by St. Patrick Church serving preschool through 8th grade.

Nearby four-year universities include The Ohio State University, Wright State University, Wittenberg University, and The University of Dayton. Nearby community colleges include Sinclair, Clark State, and Columbus State Community College.

London is served by the London Public Library. In 2005, the library loaned more than 194,000 items to its 14,000 cardholders. As of 2005, total holdings were over 48,000 volumes with over 145 periodical subscriptions.

In popular culture
The London water tower, fire department, and London High School were featured in a Nike commercial promoting the 2012 Summer Olympics.

Notable people
Warren Amling, All-American Ohio State football player, and 1945 Heisman Trophy finalist
Bob Bescher, professional baseball player
Satch Davidson, major league baseball umpire
Richard A. Harrison, U.S. Representative from Ohio
Dick LeBeau, Pro Football Hall of Fame cornerback, NFL assistant head coach and defensive coordinator
Chick McGee, radio personality on the Bob and Tom show
Agnes Thomas Morris, Shakespeare promoter, president of War Mothers of America
Rick Renick, professional baseball player and coach
Jeriah Swetland, Ohio state representative
Clyde Tingley, former governor of New Mexico

See also
Ohio to Erie Trail

References

External links

 
 London Public Library
 Photos of London in 1938

 
Cities in Ohio
Cities in Madison County, Ohio
Populated places established in 1810
County seats in Ohio
1810 establishments in Ohio